Menneus nemesio is an Australian species of net-casting spider in the family Deinopidae. This diurnal species is often found in vegetation near water, low to the ground. Usually a brown spider, though it is occasionally seen with a green abdomen.

References

Deinopidae
Spiders of Australia
Spiders described in 1877